The blue-fronted blue flycatcher (Eumyias hoevelli), also known as the blue-fronted flycatcher, is a species of bird in the family Muscicapidae.  It is endemic to Indonesia.  Its natural habitat is subtropical or tropical moist montane forests.

References

Eumyias
Endemic birds of Sulawesi
Birds described in 1903
Taxonomy articles created by Polbot